Web18 (Web18 Software Services Limited) is the Internet and mobile arm of Network 18, an Indian media conglomerate. It has a variety of information and transactional services based on the Internet.

The TV18 group holds 85 per cent in Web18 Holdings while the remaining is held by Global Broadcast News Network, a part of the group.

Web18's offerings include Moneycontrol.com, CommoditiesControl.com, Firstpost.com, News18.com, Yatra.com, Homeshop18.com and BookMyShow.com

In 2016 Network18 Group appointed Manish Maheshwari who was previously working for Flipkart as CEO of Web18.

References

External links
Web 18 to relaunch UrbanEye Media
Web 18 to intensify acquisition moves

Network18 Group
Online companies of India
Companies based in Mumbai
Companies with year of establishment missing